John S. O'Connor (27 December 1896 – 2 November 1967) was an Irish revolutionary, solicitor and Fianna Fáil politician.

Biography
O'Connor grew up in a nationalist family in County Limerick: O'Connor's father, Thomas O'Connor Senior, as well as his aunt Brigid, were founding members of Sinn Féin in 1905, while his older brother Thomas (Tommy) Junior joined the Irish Republican Brotherhood in 1915. John joined the Irish Volunteers in 1913 and took part in the Howth gun-running in 1916. Alongside his brother Tommy, he took part in the Easter Rising, serving under the command of Ned Daly. O'Connor was a section commander and was in charge of the barricades on May Lane beside the Jameson Distillery. 

Following the surrender of the rebels, O'Connor was imprisoned in Stafford Prison in England until his release in December 1916. Thereafter, he fought in the Irish War of Independence as part of the Dublin Brigade.   

After the war, O'Connor became a solicitor. In 1926 he joined Fianna Fáil on its founding. He was elected on his second attempt to join Dáil Éireann when he was elected as a Teachta Dála (TD) for the Dublin North-West constituency at the 1944 general election. He lost his seat at the 1948 general election. O'Connor served as an election agent for three separate Fianna Fáil presidents of Ireland; Douglas Hyde, Seán T. O'Kelly and Éamon de Valera.

References

1896 births
1967 deaths
Fianna Fáil TDs
Irish Republican Army (1919–1922) members
Irish solicitors
Members of the 12th Dáil
People of the Easter Rising
Politicians from County Dublin